

Events

May events
 May 24 – Monmouth Railway authorised by Act of Parliament in the United Kingdom for a railway or tramroad from the Forest of Dean to Monmouth, on the Welsh Borders, including provision to charge for passengers.

Unknown date events 
 The Leiper Railroad connecting Crum Creek to Ridley Creek, Pennsylvania opens.

Births

January births 
 January 3 – Henry Keyes, president of the Atchison, Topeka and Santa Fe Railway 1869–1870 (d. 1870).

April births
 April 15 – Whitmell P. Tunstall, first president of the Richmond and Danville Railroad (d. 1854).
 April 17 – Isaac Dripps, mechanical engineer for the Camden and Amboy Railroad who assembled the John Bull (d. 1892).

June births
 June 12 – David Levy Yulee, Florida railroad executive (d. 1886).

July births 
 July 27 – H. H. Hunnewell, director for Illinois Central Railroad 1862-1871, president of Kansas City, Fort Scott and Gulf Railroad, president of Kansas City, Lawrence and Southern Railroad, is born (died 1902).

September births 
 September 19 – Thomas Nickerson, president of the Atchison, Topeka and Santa Fe Railway 1874–1880 (d. 1892).

Unknown date births
 Joseph Harrison Jr., partner in the American steam locomotive manufacturing firm of Eastwick and Harrison (d. 1874).
 William S. Hudson, superintendent of American steam locomotive manufacturing firm of Rogers, Ketchum and Grosvenor (d. 1881).

Deaths

References